Herrö may refer to:

 Herrö, Nynäshamn Municipality - an island in the Stockholm archipelago and Nynäshamn Municipality, Stockholm County, Sweden
  -  a small town in Härjedalen municipality, Jämtland County, Sweden